Sungai Pinang is a state constituency in Penang, Malaysia, that has been represented in the Penang State Legislative Assembly since 1974. It covers much of Jelutong, one of the suburbs of George Town.

The state constituency was first contested in 1974 and is mandated to return a single Assemblyman to the Penang State Legislative Assembly under the first-past-the-post voting system. , the State Assemblyman for Sungai Pinang is Lim Siew Khim from the Democratic Action Party (DAP), which is part of the state's ruling coalition, Pakatan Harapan (PH).

Definition

Polling districts 
According to the federal gazette issued on 30 March 2018, the Sungai Pinang constituency is divided into 8 polling districts.

This state seat encompasses much of Jelutong, a suburb immediately south of George Town, as well as the neighbourhood of Sungai Pinang. Jelutong is geographically situated to the south of the Pinang River (Malay: Sungai Pinang), from where the constituency got its name.

In addition, the new coastal neighbourhood around Karpal Singh Drive falls under this constituency.

The Sungai Pinang seat is bounded to the west by Jelutong Road; a portion of Jelutong west of the road lies within the neighbouring Batu Lancang constituency. The Pinang River, up to the junction of Jalan Perak and Sungai Pinang Road, marks the seat's northern limits. The constituency's southern limits is formed by Jalan Tunku Kudin.

Demographics

History

Election results 
The electoral results for the Sungai Pinang state constituency in 2008, 2013 and 2018 are as follows.

See also 
 Constituencies of Penang

References 

Penang state constituencies